Admiral Ushakov was a Russian naval commander.

Admiral Ushakov may also refer to:

Entertainment
 Admiral Ushakov (film), a 1953 Soviet film

Ships
, a number of ships
, a Soviet cargo liner in service 1946-75